Shalinsky District is an administrative district (raion), one of the thirty in Sverdlovsk Oblast, Russia. Its administrative center is the urban locality (a work settlement) of Shalya. Population: 23,834 (2010 Census);  The population of Shalya accounts for 27.0% of the district's total population.

Administrative and municipal status
Within the framework of administrative divisions, Shalinsky District is one of the thirty in the oblast. The work settlement of Shalya serves as its administrative center.

As a municipal division, the territory of the district is split between two municipal formations—Shalinsky Urban Okrug, to which the work settlement of Shalya and thirty-eight of the administrative district's rural localities belong, and Staroutkinsk Urban Okrug, which covers the rest of the administrative district's territory, including the work settlement of Staroutkinsk and three remaining rural localities.

References

Notes

Sources

Districts of Sverdlovsk Oblast
